Cut Numbers is the first novel by Nick Tosches. It involves small-time criminals struggling to maintain the financial viability of their cut numbers game after the implementation of the New York Lottery. They establish an elaborate scheme to fix the legitimate state lottery. The main character is Louie Brunellesches, who also appears in Tosches' novel In the Hand of Dante.

See also

Lucky Numbers, a 2000 Nora Ephron/John Travolta film dealing with a similar lottery scheme.

References

Novels by Nick Tosches
1988 American novels